The Pittsburgh Saturday Visiter [sic] was an abolitionist and women's rights paper printed in Pittsburgh. Founded in 1847, Jane Swisshelm was the editor and Robert M. Riddle printed the paper. It had good circulation numbers and ran until 1854.

History 
Journalist Jane Swisshelm was the founder of the Pittsburgh Saturday Visiter [sic] and she funded the work through money in her own estate and printed the paper with Robert M. Riddle. Swisshelm served as the editor and Riddle printing the paper. At the time, the abolitionist newspaper in Pittsburgh had closed and a new paper was needed. She launched the Saturday Visiter on December 20, 1847. There were crowds actually waiting in the streets for the first issue. Swisshelm spelled "visitor" as "visiter" and believed her spelling was correct.

The Saturday Visiter published women's rights, temperance, and abolitionist editorials. She also endorsed Free Soil arguments against slavery. The paper had a good circulation with around 6,000 subscribers, though more subscribers actually lived outside of Pennsylvania.

Eventually, Swisshelm started looking to sell the Visiter in 1853, and looked for someone with similar political views as herself. After Swisshelm had a child, she realized that she was neglecting the work on the Visiter. The paper itself went bankrupt by 1854, despite its good circulation and was sold to Riddle. Riddle merged the paper with the weekly edition of his Commercial Journal, keeping Swisshelm on as editor.

Reception 
Frederick Douglass said, "There are few papers exerting greater influence than the Saturday Visiter, edited by Mrs. Swisshelm."

References

Sources

External links 

 Pittsburgh Saturday Visiter

Feminism in the United States
Newspapers established in 1847
Abolitionist newspapers published in the United States
Defunct newspapers published in Pittsburgh
Women in Pennsylvania
Publications established in 1847
Publications disestablished in 1854
Feminist newspapers